James G. Thompson (born January 15, 1829 in Sharon, Schoharie County, New York) was an American politician from New York.

Life
He graduated from Rensselaer Polytechnic Institute, and then taught school. Later he engaged in the book and stationery business in Norwich. In 1857, he married Julia Frances Foote, and they had several children.

He was Treasurer of Chenango County from 1855 to 1857; Clerk of Chenango County from 1858 to 1872; School Superintendent; and Supervisor of the Town of Norwich.

In 1873, the Republican nomination for state senator from the 23rd District (comprising Schoharie, Delaware and Chenango counties) was disputed by one candidate from each of the three counties, and Thompson was nominated on the 143rd ballot. He was elected by a majority of a single vote, and was a member of the New York State Senate (23rd D.) in 1874 and 1875. His election was unsuccessfully contested by his Democratic opponent William Yeomans Jr.

Sources
 Life Sketches of Government Officers and Members of the Legislature of the State of New York in 1875 by W. H. McElroy and Alexander McBride (pg. 102ff) [e-book]
 The New York Civil List compiled by Franklin Benjamin Hough, Stephen C. Hutchins and Edgar Albert Werner (1870; pg. 545 and 553)
 POLITICAL PARAGRAPHS in NYT on September 26, 1873
 THE STATE LEGISLATURE; SENATE in NYT on February 5, 1874

1829 births
Year of death missing
Republican Party New York (state) state senators
People from Sharon, New York
People from Chenango County, New York
Town supervisors in New York (state)
Rensselaer Polytechnic Institute alumni